Amflutizole is a xanthine oxidase inhibitor used for the treatment of gout.

References 

Xanthine oxidase inhibitors
Trifluoromethyl compounds
Isothiazoles
Carboxylic acids